Vendhar TV is an Indian general entertainment television channel broadcasting in the Tamil-language. It was launched on 24 August 2014 by SRM group.

The channel features a number of shows, such as Oru Sol Khealir, Vendhar Veetu Kalyanam, Sundharakandam, Bharathi Kannamma, Mudivalla Arambam, Suryavamsam, Iruvar, Ninaithale Innikum, Kollywood Roundup, Puthumputhu Kaalai, Ring O Ring, and Thinnai.

Programming

 Thai Veedu

Dubbed soap operas
 Kannae En Kannmaniey
 Suryavamsam

References

External links
  
 Vendhar TV on YouTube

Tamil-language television channels
Television channels and stations established in 2014
2014 establishments in India
Television stations in Chennai